Truszki  is a village in the administrative district of Gmina Śniadowo, within Łomża County, Podlaskie Voivodeship, in north-eastern Poland.

The village has a population of 180.

References

Villages in Łomża County